Shorea bullata (called, along with some other species in the genus Shorea, dark red meranti) is a species of plant in the family Dipterocarpaceae. It is endemic to Borneo.

References

See also
List of Shorea species

bullata
Endemic flora of Borneo
Trees of Borneo
Taxonomy articles created by Polbot